This is a list of Civil War units from Pennsylvania.

Infantry

Volunteer Infantry
Note: There are "gaps" in the numbering for the infantry regiments. This is because Pennsylvania numbered all regiments, regardless of branch, in sequence depending on when the regiment was raised. For example, the 6th Cavalry was also numbered the 70th Volunteer Regiment since it was raised between the 69th Infantry and the 71st Infantry, thereby there is no 70th Infantry.

1st Regiment
2nd Regiment
3rd Regiment
4th Regiment 
5th Regiment
6th Regiment
7th Regiment
8th Regiment
9th Regiment
10th Regiment
11th Regiment
12th Regiment
13th Regiment
14th Regiment
15th Regiment
16th Regiment
17th Regiment
18th Regiment
19th Regiment
20th Regiment
21st Regiment
22nd Regiment
23rd Regiment
24th Regiment
25th Regiment
26th Regiment
27th Regiment
28th Regiment
29th Regiment
30th through 44th Regiment – See Pennsylvania Reserves section below
45th Regiment
46th Regiment
47th Regiment
48th Regiment
49th Regiment
50th Regiment
51st Regiment
52nd Regiment
53rd Regiment
54th Regiment
55th Regiment
56th Regiment
57th Regiment
58th Regiment
61st Regiment
62nd Regiment
63rd Regiment
66th Regiment
67th Regiment
68th Regiment
69th Regiment (Originally 2nd California)
71st Regiment (Originally 1st California)
72nd Regiment (Originally 3rd California)
73rd Regiment
74th Regiment
75th Regiment
76th Regiment
77th Regiment
78th Regiment
79th Regiment
81st Regiment
82nd Regiment
83rd Regiment
84th Regiment
85th Regiment
86th Regiment - failed to complete organization
87th Regiment
88th Regiment
90th Regiment
91st Regiment
93rd Regiment
94th Regiment
95th Regiment
96th Regiment
97th Regiment
98th Regiment
99th Regiment
100th Regiment
101st Regiment
102nd Regiment
103rd Regiment
104th Regiment
105th Regiment - The Wildcat Regiment
106th Regiment (Originally 5th California)
107th Regiment
109th Regiment
110th Regiment
111th Regiment
112th Regiment - See 2nd Heavy Artillery
113th Regiment - See 12th Cavalry
114th Regiment
115th Regiment

116th Regiment
118th Regiment
119th Regiment
120th Regiment - failed to complete organization
121st Regiment
122nd Regiment
123rd Regiment
124th Regiment
125th Regiment
126th Regiment
127th Regiment
128th Regiment
129th Regiment
130th Regiment
131st Regiment
132nd Regiment
133rd Regiment
134th Regiment
135th Regiment
136th Regiment
137th Regiment
138th Regiment
139th Regiment
140th Regiment
141st Regiment
142nd Regiment
143rd Regiment
144th Regiment
145th Regiment
146th Regiment - failed to complete organization
147th Regiment
148th Regiment
149th Regiment
150th Regiment
151st Regiment
152nd Regiment
153rd Regiment
154th Regiment
155th Regiment
156th Regiment - failed to complete organization
157th Regiment
158th Regiment
164th Regiment
165th Regiment
166th Regiment
167th Regiment
168th Regiment
169th Regiment
170th Regiment
171st Regiment
172nd Regiment
173rd Regiment
174th Regiment
175th Regiment
176th Regiment
177th Regiment
178th Regiment
179th Regiment
183rd Regiment
184th Regiment
186th Regiment
187th Regiment
188th Regiment
189th Regiment
190th Regiment
191st Regiment
192nd Regiment
193rd Regiment
194th Regiment
195th Regiment
196th Regiment
197th Regiment
198th Regiment
199th Regiment
200th Regiment
201st Regiment
202nd Regiment
203rd Regiment
205th Regiment
206th Regiment
207th Regiment
208th Regiment
209th Regiment
210th Regiment
211th Regiment
213th Regiment
214th Regiment
215th Regiment
Erie Regiment

U.S. Colored Troops
3rd Regiment
6th Regiment
8th Regiment
24th Regiment
25th Regiment
32nd Regiment
41st Regiment
43rd Regiment
45th Regiment
127th Regiment

Pennsylvania Reserves
1st Reserves (30th Infantry)
2nd Reserves (31st Infantry)
3rd Reserves (32nd Infantry)
4th Reserves (33rd Infantry)
5th Reserves (34th Infantry)
6th Reserves (35th Infantry)
7th Reserves (36th Infantry)
8th Reserves (37th Infantry)
9th Reserves (38th Infantry)
10th Reserves (39th Infantry)
11th Reserves (40th Infantry)
12th Reserves (41st Infantry)
13th Reserves (42nd Infantry) - (1st Pennsylvania Rifles, "Bucktails")
14th Reserves (1st Light Artillery) - (43rd Volunteers)
15th Reserves (1st Cavalry) (44th Volunteers)

Others
Philadelphia Brigade (California Brigade) (69th, 71st, 72nd and 106th Infantry Regiments)
Southard's Independent Company, Colored Infantry

Cavalry
1st Regiment -- See "15th Reserves (1st Pennsylvania Cavalry)"
2nd Regiment -- ("59th Volunteers")
3rd Regiment
4th Regiment
5th Regiment -- ("65th Volunteers")
6th Regiment
7th Regiment
8th Regiment -- ("89th Volunteers")
9th Regiment
10th Regiment
11th Regiment -- ("108th Volunteers")
12th Regiment
13th Regiment -- ("117th Volunteers")
14th Regiment -- ("159th Volunteers")
15th Regiment -- ("160th Volunteers")
16th Regiment -- ("161st Volunteers")
17th Regiment
18th Regiment -- ("163rd Volunteers")
19th Regiment -- ("180th Volunteers")
20th Regiment -- ("181st Volunteers")
21st Regiment
22nd Regiment
1st Provisional Regiment
2nd Provisional Regiment
3rd Provisional Regiment
Anderson Troop

Artillery

Light Artillery
1st Regiment, Light Artillery (14th Reserves)
Battery A
Battery B
Battery C
Battery D
Battery F
Battery G
Battery H
Battery I

Independent Light Artillery Batteries
Battery A ("Schaffer's Battery") - garrison duty 1861–1865
Battery B (also known as Muehler's or Stevens' Battery, or 26th Indp't Battery, PA Artillery)
Battery C ("Thompson's Battery")
Battery D ("Durell's Battery")
Battery E ("Knap's Battery")
Battery F ("Hampton's Battery")
Battery G ("Young's Battery") - garrison duty 1862–1865
Battery H ("John Nevin's Battery") - garrison duty 1862–1865
Battery I ("Robert J. Nevin's Battery") - garrison duty 1863–1865

Heavy Artillery
2nd Regiment
2nd Provisional Regiment
3rd Regiment
5th Regiment
6th Regiment

See also
List of American Civil War units by state
United States Colored Troops

 
Pennsylvania
Civil War